Sdu or SDU may refer to:

Communications
Satellite Data Unit, a part of a satellite telecommunication system for aircraft
Service Data Unit, a telecommunications term related to the layered protocol concept

Universities
University of Southern Denmark, Danish: Syddansk Universitet (SDU)
Süleyman Demirel University, a university in Isparta, Turkey
Suleyman Demirel University, a university in Almaty, Kazakhstan
Shandong University (山东大学 SDU), a university in Shandong, China
Sanda University(上海杉达学院 SDU），a university in Shanghai, China

Other
Single dwelling unit, a single-family, free-standing residential building (home). It is defined in opposition to a multi-family residential dwelling (e.g. apartment).
Special Detective Unit, a specialist branch of the Garda Síochána, Ireland's national police
Special Duties Unit, a paramilitary special force of the Hong Kong Police Force
Surveillance Detection Unit, a surveillance program connected to US embassies.
Santos Dumont Airport, the smaller of the two airports in Rio de Janeiro, Brazil (IATA code)
SDU: Sex Duties Unit, a 2013 Hong Kong action comedy film
Social Development Unit, a matchmaking agency in Singapore
Social Democratic Union (disambiguation), a name of a number of political parties
Sonic Diver Unit, special mecha unit piloted by the Sky Girls (Japanese anime)
Sodium diuranate, a uranium salt that is an intermediate in the production of the metal
Sdu (publishing company), a Dutch publishing company, formerly the Staatsdrukkerij en Uitgeverij
Sewer Dosing Unit, a plumbing device that facilitates sewage disposal with low liquid-flow rates
Sweden Democratic Youth, the former youth league of the Swedish political party Sweden Democrats
State Disbursement Unit, a government agency in the United States that handles child support payments
NHS Sustainable Development Unit in the United Kingdom